Broad Street is a  road located in the independent city of Richmond, Virginia, and adjacent Henrico County. Broad Street is significant to Richmond due to the many commercial establishments that have been built along it throughout Richmond's history. From downtown through miles into the suburbs, the street is largely dedicated to retailing and offices, including regional and neighborhood shopping centers and malls.

Description
The east end of Broad Street is located at the northeastern edge of Chimborazo Park. It extends through Church Hill to Downtown Richmond. Also known as U.S. Route 250 west of Downtown Richmond, it extends west through Richmond's West End all the way to the outermost suburbs of Richmond just beyond Short Pump near the intersection of I-295 and I-64.

Continuing west into Goochland County Broad Street becomes Broad Street Rd. U.S. Route 250; the road extends all the way to Sandusky, OH.

The GRTC Pulse bus rapid transit line follows Broad Street from its terminus at the Willow Lawn station on the western edge of the city east to 14th Street in Downtown Richmond.

History and development

Downtown 

Broad Street connects many historical sites in Downtown Richmond.  It is home to the lavish Empire Theatre, which is the state's oldest operating theatre.  Theatre IV, the Children's Theatre of Virginia, the second largest children's theatre in the nation, owns the Empire and presents its mainstage season there in downtown Richmond. Until the late 19th century, the trains of the Richmond, Fredericksburg and Potomac Railroad ran down the center of the street from the present Harrison Street east to Eighth Street. The area around Sixth and Broad Streets was the center of retailing in the Southeast, with department stores such as Miller & Rhoads, Thalhimers, G. C. Murphy, Woolworth, Raylass, Sears, Cohen's and W. T. Grant and niche retailers like Hofheimer's. It was also home to "theater row", which included venues such as the National.

It has also been the site of major institutional structures, including Monumental Church, the Library of Virginia, the present and former city halls, and the Virginia Department of Transportation headquarters.

In 1919, the Richmond, Fredericksburg and Potomac Railroad relocated its terminal to the more suburban Broad Street Station.

West End
As Richmond moved westward, so did the retail district. Miles away, Short Pump Town Center in western Henrico County on Broad Street has leading retailers including Macy's and Dillard's.

See also

Transportation in Richmond, Virginia

References

Commercial buildings on the National Register of Historic Places in Virginia
Transportation in Richmond, Virginia
National Register of Historic Places in Richmond, Virginia
U.S. Route 250
Historic districts on the National Register of Historic Places in Virginia
Bridges in Richmond, Virginia